Bahadurpura Assembly constituency is a constituency of Telangana Legislative Assembly, India. It is one of 15 constituencies in Capital city of Hyderabad. It is part of Hyderabad Lok Sabha constituency. Bahadur Pura was derived from the name of Ranmast khan aka Nawab Ibrahim ali khan Bahadur who was the  Rayeez ul kurnool.

Mohd. Moazam Khan of All India Majlis-e-Ittehadul Muslimeen won the seat for the second time with record majority of 95,045 votes.

Extent of the constituency
The constituency was created before the 2009 elections as per Delimitation Act of 2002.
The Assembly Constituency presently comprises the following neighbourhoods:

Members of Legislative Assembly

Election results

Telangana Legislative Assembly election, 2018

Telangana Legislative Assembly election, 2014

References

See also
 List of constituencies of Telangana Legislative Assembly

Assembly constituencies of Telangana